Nefarius (Lloyd Bloch), previously known as Moonstone, is a supervillain appearing in American comic books published by Marvel Comics.

Publication history

The character first appeared in Captain America #169 (1974) and was created by Steve Englehart, Mike Friedrich and Sal Buscema.

Fictional character biography
As Moonstone, Lloyd Bloch was an agent of the second Secret Empire and its front organization, the Committee to Regain America's Principles (C.R.A.P.), set up by them to discredit Captain America and take his place as America's "symbolic" hero. The Empire had previously damaged Cap's reputation by accusing him of vigilantism and framing him for the death of small-time criminal the Tumbler. Moonstone was empowered by a stone found in the Moon's surface, hence his codename, and he posed as a new American costumed crime-fighter. During the Secret Empire's "attack" on the White House, he claimed that he could not defeat their plans, intending to discourage resistance from the public. Moonstone was subsequently exposed, and attacked and defeated by Captain America while the Falcon, Cyclops, and Marvel Girl took out the rest of the Empire's soldiers. After the Secret Empire's defeat he was arrested. His alien gem was stolen from him by his psychiatrist, Dr. Karla Sofen, who psychologically manipulated him to convince him that it was turning him into a monster and reject it, thereby losing his superhuman powers. Sofen took the gem and became the second Moonstone.

Bloch later resurfaced with ionic powers similar to those of Wonder Man, bearing the new codename "Nefarius" and claiming to be the son of Count Nefaria. He captured Sofen and planned to kill her in revenge. He battled Captain America and Quasar. He was defeated by Sofen and sent to the Vault. Bloch was apparently killed by Nefaria, when he drained the ionic energy from him.

Powers and abilities
As Moonstone, Bloch's superhuman powers were derived from an alien "moonstone," a rock taken from the Blue Area of the Moon and charged with unknown energy. He possessed superhuman strength, stamina, and reflexes. Bloch later suffered psychological instability as a result of the trauma of rejecting the "moonstone" from his body, which rendered him psychotic for a time.

As Nefarius, Bloch gained his superhuman powers through a mutagenic process originally devised by Dr. Kenneth Sturdy. He possessed superhuman strength, speed, stamina, durability, agility, and reflexes. Nefarius possesses superhuman leaping ability, enabling him to cover vast distances. He can also generate intense heat beams from his eyes without harm to himself.

Bloch is a formidable hand-to-hand combatant, and received extensive unarmed combat training from the second Secret Empire.

Other versions

Counter-Earth
During the Thunderbolts' sojourn on Counter-Earth, Sofen encountered Bloch's counterpart who went by the codename Phantom Eagle. The alternate Bloch became obsessed with Moonstone and began experiencing psychotic episodes and was exposed as a serial killer. Sofen proceeded to steal his equivalent stone too.

References

External links

Characters created by Mike Friedrich
Characters created by Sal Buscema
Characters created by Steve Englehart
Comics characters introduced in 1974
Fictional characters with superhuman durability or invulnerability
Marvel Comics characters with superhuman strength
Marvel Comics mutates
Marvel Comics supervillains